Carlos Galo Raúl Bonilla Chávez better known as Carlos Bonilla (March 21, 1923 – January 10, 2010) was one of the pioneers of the Ecuadorian classical guitar and an important figure in 20th-century Ecuadorian music.

Biography
Chávez was born in Quito and studied at the National Conservatorio Nacional de Música de Quito, where in 1952 he became professor of guitar and composition.

In 1962, Bonilla founded the first guitar department at the National Conservatory of Music in Quito, Ecuador. Sought after to perform many of his own compositions which featured solo guitar and orchestra, Bonilla frequently performed with the National Symphony Orchestra of Ecuador and the Colombian Philharmonic Orchestra.  Ever since the Ecuadorian National Symphony Orchestra was established in 1956, Bonilla served as principal contrabass until his retirement in 1985. He also performed a contrabass solo, Concert of Cañonery, accompanied on the piano by his brother Hector Bonilla.Stevenson. 2001. 20: 685

Compositions
Mil años de música for orchestra
Raíces, for guitare & orchestra
Rumiñahui for orchestra
Chasqui
Suite andina
Eco andino
Acuarela indígena
Atahualpa (yumbo)
Tambores shyris
Ponchito al hombro
Indiecito otavaleño
Elegía y danza, for guitar (Paris, Éditions Max Eschig)
Preludio y Yumbo, for guitar (Paris, Éditions Max Eschig)
Beatriz (pasillo)
Subyugante (pasillo)
Cantares del alma (pasillo)
Sueña mi bien (pasillo)
Idílica, (pasillo)
Pasillo No. 2
Nocturno (pasillo)
Solo tú (pasillo).

References

Bibliography
Alexander, Francisco. Música y músicos. Ensayos en miniatura. Quito: Edited by Casa de la Cultura Ecuatoriana, 1970.
Montúfar, Alfonso. 'Carlos Bonilla Chávez'. In: Letras del Ecuador, No. 128. Quito, 1963
Stevenson, Robert. 2001. "Quito". The New Grove Dictionary of Music and Musicians, second edition, edited by Stanley Sadie & John Tyrrel. London: Macmillan Publishers; New York: Grove's Dictionaries of Music.

External links
Edufuturo
Classical guitar

1923 births
2010 deaths
Composers for the classical guitar
Ecuadorian classical guitarists
Ecuadorian composers